Point San Pablo Harbor is a marina and small community at the far end of Point San Pablo in San Pablo Bay, within Richmond, in Contra Costa County, California. It is located at 1900 Stenmark Drive, Richmond CA 94801.

Overview

The community is home to a few dozen individuals living in boats and 10 floating homes.  Point San Pablo Harbor was originally envisioned by Captain Clark who was the brainchild behind the origins of the Richmond San Rafael Ferry. The area also features the Point San Pablo Marina, Nobilis Restaurant, and The San Pablo Bay Sportsmen's Club. The harbor village is located in a ravine at the northern tip of the Potrero Hills and alongside a small cove the opens to San Pablo Bay, where the marina is protected from waves, in addition to a breakwater. The harbor is also the starting point for visitors to East Brother Light Station a historic landmark.

The area is near the Chevron Richmond Refinery and some tank farm containers are visible in addition to the Richmond Landfill across the waters of Castro Cove, a contaminated estuarine habitat. Point San Pablo Beach is also located here.

The harbor has panoramic views of the undeveloped coastlines of southern Napa, Sonoma, and Solano counties and eastern central Marin County. The hills surrounding the village feature Eucalyptus trees and coastal chaparral vegetation. The isolation of the area and undeveloped lands make deer sightings commonplace. Other animals in the area include the endangered salt marsh harvest mouse and California clapper rail. The areas around the marina and breakwaters have many egrets, herons and other birds that enjoy the small wetlands areas.

The Point San Pablo Harbor is privately owned. The Point San Pablo Preservation Society is a non-profit organization located at the harbor. The society's goal is to preserve the harbor and surrounding lands and waterways for public use and enjoyment.

See also
 San Pablo Peninsula

References

External links
Point San Pablo Harbor website
Point San Pablo History website

Neighborhoods in Richmond, California
San Pablo Bay
Populated coastal places in California
Ports and harbors of California